Ananda Lewis (born March 21, 1973) is an American television host, carpenter, former model, and social activist. She was an MTV veejay from the late 1990s until 2001, when she left the network to host her own broadcast syndicated television talk show, The Ananda Lewis Show. She was a correspondent for The Insider from 2004 to 2005. She then became a carpenter. She hosted the 2019 revival of While You Were Out on TLC.

On October 1, 2020, Lewis announced to her Instagram followers that she has been battling stage 3 breast cancer for the last two years.

Biography

Early life
Lewis was born on March 21, 1973 in Los Angeles. She is of African American and Native American descent, specifically of the Creek and Blackfoot tribes. Her first name means "bliss" in Sanskrit. Lewis's mother worked as an account manager for Pacific Bell, and her father as a computer-animation specialist. Her sister, Lakshmi, is a physician. Lewis's parents divorced when Ananda was two years old, and her mother moved with her daughters to San Diego, California, to be near her own mother. Her mother took an extended trip to Europe to escape the pain of her failed marriage, leaving Ananda and Lakshmi with their grandmother. During her absence which lasted less than a year, Lewis felt abandoned. She states: It was like she nurtured me and carried me in her womb and then completely left. Lewis often fought with her mother while growing up and rarely saw her father, who had remarried. Lewis and her grandmother also frequently "locked horns" while she was growing up.

Lewis struggled with a speech impediment, stuttering until she was eight years old. In grade school she earned a reputation for outspokenness. In 1981 Lewis entered herself in the Little Miss San Diego Contest, a beauty pageant, and won. During the talent portion of the competition, Lewis performed a dance routine, which she had choreographed herself, to Stevie Wonder and Paul McCartney's ballad "Ebony and Ivory". After her win, Lewis attracted the attention of a talent agent and began working in local theater productions and on television. In fourth grade she enrolled at the San Diego School of Creative and Performance Arts (SCPA), a public magnet school, where she remained for nine years. At the age of thirteen, Lewis began volunteering as a tutor and counselor at a Head Start facility. Lewis was inspired by the work and decided to become a teacher or a psychologist, with the goal of helping young people. However, Lewis's family urged her to follow a more lucrative career path, specifically law. She majored in history at Howard University, in Washington, D.C., from which she graduated cum laude in 1995.

Personal life
Lewis has credited her mother, grandmother, and sister for providing her with a positive, supportive environment. By her own account, as she grew older she felt increasingly upset by her parents' divorce. In adulthood Lewis has healed her rifts with both parents. Lewis was a good friend of singer and actress Aaliyah before her accidental death. Lewis has six godchildren. In 2011, Lewis gave birth to son Langston, her first child, with Harry Smith. She currently resides in the San Fernando Valley.

On October 2, 2020, Lewis revealed that she has been battling breast cancer for 2 years. She said that her aversion to mammograms took time from her ability to find out about the cancer in a timely manner, and begs for the public to get cancer screenings as soon as necessary.

Career

Early career

While a student at Howard University in 1993, Lewis was featured prominently in the hit R&B video by fellow HU alumni Shai,  "Baby, I'm Yours", filmed on campus. She portrayed the love interest of vocalist Carl "Groove" Martin.

Throughout college Lewis had volunteered as a mentor with the group Youth at Risk and at the Youth Leadership Institute. She was considering attending graduate school to pursue a master's degree in education when she learned that auditions were going to be held for the job of on-screen host of BET's Teen Summit. She states that the children she was working with that summer were the main ones pushing her to go to the auditions.

Lewis's audition would be a success and she became the host of Teen Summit. For three seasons she discussed serious issues affecting teenagers for a television audience of several million. The show's topical, debate-driven format enabled Lewis to follow her passion for helping young people, and use her skills she had acquired at the performing-arts school in San Diego. In 1996, on an installment of the show entitled "It Takes a Village", Lewis interviewed then-First Lady Hillary Clinton, whose book with that title had been published earlier in the year. Also in 1996 Teen Summit was nominated for a CableACE Award, and the next year the National Association for the Advancement of Colored People (NAACP) presented Lewis with an Image Award for her work on Black Entertainment Television (BET). Soon afterward the cable network MTV offered Lewis a position as a program host and video jockey. The thought of leaving Teen Summit was painful for her; indeed, several sources quoted her as recalling that she "cried for three weeks" while pondering her choices. In opting to move to MTV, the deciding factor was the possibility of greatly increasing the size of her viewing audience and the potential for influencing America's youth.

Lewis hosted and VJed a variety of shows includingTotal Request Live, a daily top ten video-countdown show, and Hot Zone, which offered both music videos and Lewis's interviews of musicians and others. On one notable installment of The Hot Zone, she berated the rapper Q-Tip about the number of scantily clad dancers in one of his videos. In a reference to Lewis's broadcasting savvy, Bob Kusbit, MTV's senior vice president for production, told Douglas Century for The New York Times on November 21, 1999, "In the past our talent was sometimes just pretty people who could read cue cards. But when we brought Ananda to MTV, we decided we were going to do a lot more live television." MTV also called upon Lewis to host other topical programs including two MTV forums on violence in schools, which aired after the Columbine High School massacre and several memorial tributes for the singer Aaliyah, who died in a plane crash in 2001. In 2001 Lewis earned another NAACP Image Award, for her hosting of the MTV special True Life: I Am Driving While Black.

In 1998, while at MTV, Lewis made headlines when she announced that she intended to remain abstinent for at least six months. She states:

I made the decision for selfish reasons, but I'm going public here because I realized I might be able to help other girls, too. I know the kind of drama that being sexually active brings to your life. I felt that if it was good for me to take a break, it might be good for other young girls, too. You see, I think I would be a whole different person if I hadn't had sex so early. Everybody was saying, "Do it!" but nobody ever said, "You don't have to do it". I think hearing that would have made a huge difference in my life.

Also during that period Lewis became a familiar presence at celebrity-attended events in and around New York City. "If you don't recognize the name Ananda Lewis, it may be because you're older than 23, or not a hip-hop star, or not a regular supplicant in the land of the velvet ropes," Century wrote at the height of Lewis' fame. "In the last year, Ms. Lewis has emerged as the hip-hop generation's reigning 'It Girl,' meaning she is not just an MTV personality but a woman whose looks and attitudes have made her perpetually in demand."

Later career
In 2000, People included Lewis on its list of the world's "50 Most Beautiful People". In 2001, Lewis decided to leave MTV in order to start her own talk show. The Ananda Lewis Show debuted on September 10, 2001, after much advance press in which Lewis was compared to Oprah Winfrey. Lewis continued to do special presentations for MTV after her show had begun. Lewis's series which was syndicated by King World Productions, targeted women between the ages of eighteen and thirty-four by addressing such issues as domestic violence and breast cancer; it was billed as an alternative to the sensationalism and provocative offerings of Jerry Springer and Ricki Lake, whose talk shows were then dominating daytime ratings. Lewis's show aired on some WB and NBC stations before being canceled after one season. Her show's producers stated: "We started on a Monday and then there was the World Trade Center bombing the next day, and everything has become a mess since then," Roger King, the chairman and CEO of King World Productions and CBS Enterprises. Lewis then worked briefly for BET.

In 2004 Lewis became the chief correspondent on celebrity subjects for the nationally syndicated, nightly entertainment program The Insider, a spin-off of the popular Entertainment Tonight. In the spring of 2005, she interviewed Paris Hilton, Dylan Ryder, Don Cheadle, Ryan Phillippe, and actress Dyan Cannon. Lewis herself has made guest appearances on several sitcoms.

In 2004 Ms. Lewis also appeared on the ABC network's reality show called Celebrity Mole: Yucatán. This reality series won an Emmy for Outstanding Achievement for Enhanced Television.

An avid animal lover, Lewis has served as co-host of the A&E television-network show America's Top Dog and as a spokesperson for the Humane Society. She has been known to frequently introduce her two pet chihuahuas to interviewers. She has also been a spokesperson for Reading Is Fundamental, a nonprofit literacy group.

References

External links

Ananda Lewis at AskMen.com

1973 births
American infotainers
American radio personalities
American television reporters and correspondents
American television talk show hosts
Blackfoot people
Howard University alumni
Living people
People from San Diego
VJs (media personalities)
Journalists from Montana
Journalists from California
African-American television talk show hosts
21st-century African-American people
20th-century African-American people